The Bucharest World War II bombings were primarily Allied bombings of railroad targets and those of the Oil Campaign of World War II, but included a bombing by Nazi Germany after the 1944 coup d'état. Bucharest stored and distributed much of Ploiești's refined oil products.

The first operation was a sequence of 17 aerial bombardments, starting with the one of April 4, 1944. The bombings were carried out over a period of about 4 months by the United States Air Force and the British Royal Air Force, with approximately 3,640 bombers of different types, accompanied by about 1,830 fighters. As collateral damage, 5,524 inhabitants were killed, 3,373 were injured, and 47,974 were left homeless. The second operation was executed by the German Luftwaffe in retaliation for Romania having changed sides (immediately after the fall of the fascist regime headed by Ion Antonescu), and took place on August 23–26, 1944.

Taking into account the large number of victims and damage caused, the aerial bombings of 1944 represent the greatest tragedy in the history of Bucharest in the twentieth century.

Raids

See also
Bombing of Romania in World War II

References

History of Bucharest
Bucharest
Bucharest
Romania–United Kingdom military relations
Romania–United States military relations
Disasters in Bucharest
1940s in Romania
20th century in Bucharest
Bucharest
Romania in World War II